Lieutenant General Thet Pon (also spelt Thet Pone) is a Burmese military officer and current commander of the Bureau of Special Operations (BSO) for the Yangon Region. He was appointed to the post in June 2020, and previously served as the commander of the Yangon Command. He has been sanctioned by the European Union, Switzerland, and Canada for violating human rights and committing crimes against civilians.

Military career 
Thet Pon graduated from the Defence Services Academy.

Personal life 
Thet Pon is married to Hnin Hnin Ei, and has two sons, Phyo Pyae Thet Pon and Min Pyae Thet Pon.

See also 

 2021–2023 Myanmar civil war
 State Administration Council
 Tatmadaw

References 

Living people
Burmese generals
Defence Services Academy alumni
Year of birth missing (living people)